Galabets is a village in Pomorie Municipality, Burgas Province, Bulgaria.
The nearest airport is Burgas Airport.
Galabets is 20 km from the largest Bulgarian sea side town of Sunny Beach with over 6 km of sandy beach.
Local villages near Galabets are Goritsa, Poroy, Alexandrovo and Tankovo.

Villages in Burgas Province